Barbara Redl (born 2 April 1968 in Weiz, Austria) is an Austrian actress.

Biography 
Redl grew up in Steyr, where she trained as kindergarten teacher. She studied from 1993 to 1996 acting at the Franz Schubert Konservatorium in Vienna. Her first engagement was at the Fränkisches Theater Schloss Maßbach from 1996 to 1998. Later she played at more than 20 theaters in Austria and Germany (including Vienna and Hamburg) and the Tournee Theater Greve. She has a daughter called Madeleine.

Appearances (selection)

Theater 
 Lead roles at the Fränkisches Theater Schloss Maßbach (1996 - 1998)
 Alkmene in Amphitryon, Director: Alexander Kraft
 Jelena in Onkel Wanja, Director: Werner Müller
 Corie in Barfuß im Park, Director: Herbert Heinz
 Stella in Die heilige Flamme, Director: Friedrich Bremer
 Dejanira in Mirandolina, Director: Jochen Thau
 Pamela in Außer Kontrolle, Director: Herbert Heinz
 Anna in Vertauschte Rollen, Director: Jochen Thau
 Vici Raynolds in Keine Leiche ohne Lilly, Director: Herbert Heinz
 Lehrerin in Pippi Langstrumpf, Director: Herbert Heinz
 Engagements and main roles in other theaters
 Magda in Gespenster, Director: Katja Thost (Theater Experiment, Wien)
 Lila in Oh Engelsfut, Director: Dominik Castell (Freie Produktion in Wien)
 Jackie O. in The House of Yes, Director: Patrick Fichte (Theater in der Basilika, Hamburg)
 Fanchette in Figaros Hochzeit oder der tolle Tag, Director: Valery Grishko (Ernst Deutsch Theater, Hamburg)
 Csilla Szilágyi in Herr Grillparzer faßt sich ein Herz und fährt mit einem Dampfer ans Schwarze Meer, von Erwin Riess mit Rainer Frieb, Director: Susanne Wolf, dietheater Konzerthaus Wien
 Bianca in Der Widerspenstigen Zähmung, Director: A. Strobele, Sommerfestspiele Röttingen
 NEGER, (H. Kislinger, UA), Director: P. Harnoncourt, Schauspielhaus Wien, 2001
 Chinoiserie Theater production after the book Die Schwestern Makioka von Junichiro Tanizaki, Director: Ong Keng Sen
 Offenes Geheimnis (Ex-Jugoslawien), Director: Ong Keng Sen, Schauspielhaus Wien
 Götz von Berlichingen by Johann Wolfgang von Goethe, Ensemble Theater Wien, Loser Kulturverein
 Der eingebildete Kranke (Theater absolute, Schlossfestspiele Piber)
 Alkemene in Amphitryon, Director: Renate Woltron (Loser Kulturverein, 2008)

Film and Television 
 Medicopter 117 – Jedes Leben zählt, Director: Thomas Nikel
 SOKO Wien - Menschenjagd
 Julia – Eine ungewöhnliche Frau, Director: Thomas Roth
 SOKO Kitzbühel, Director: Michael Zens 
 Veromica Russo (lead role) in Hainburg - Liebe und Widerstand  Director: Wolfgang Murnberger

References

External links 

 
 Biography at ORF

1968 births
Austrian film actresses
Living people